The Oakville Symphony is a Canadian orchestra performing in Oakville, Ontario.

History 
The Oakville Symphony was founded in 1967 by Kenneth Hollier, a local musician and educator with the original mission statement to “make music for the pleasure of its members and the enjoyment of its audience”.  The Oakville Symphony currently performs at the Oakville Centre for the Performing Arts.

In 1968, a small group met for the first rehearsal in a music room at T. A. Blakelock High School, among which a few members still perform with the orchestra today.  The newly formed orchestra's first performance was held at the YMCA on June 24, 1968.

The Oakville Symphony has a long history of presenting collaborations with local groups including the White Oaks Choral Society, the Clarkson Opera Society, the Oakville School of Ballet, the Oakville Children's Choir and the Oakville Suzuki Association.

From 1998 to 2020, the Oakville Symphony has been under the direction of Roberto De Clara. Initiatives such as the Young Artist Awards, a Family Christmas Concert and a Young People's Concert plus a program of community outreach called Meet a Musician and the maestro's popular Not Just the Score talks have ensured that audiences of all ages are reached in the community.

The Oakville Symphony has a loyal base of subscribers for its main concert series which takes place on four weekends a season with two performances of each concert which are close to sold-out. The Orchestra attracts guest soloists of international renown who enjoy the warmth of the welcome from musicians and patrons alike. A review of pianist Christopher Goodpasture's performance of Grieg's Concerto for Piano in A minor with the OS stated, "The orchestra seemed to understand that this was a very special performance and rose to the challenge with its best work. The communication between soloist, orchestra and conductor was akin to that of a chamber ensemble."

Over 80 musicians play regularly with the orchestra, eleven of them are paid professionals who lead sections and mentor the high school students in the Young Artist program.

For the 2022/2023 season, the orchestra performs the following repertoire:

See also
 List of symphony orchestras
 Canadian classical music

References

External links
Oakville Symphony Orchestra official website
Oakville Centre for the Performing Arts official website

Canadian orchestras
Musical groups established in 1967
Culture of the Regional Municipality of Halton
Tourist attractions in the Regional Municipality of Halton
Oakville, Ontario
1967 establishments in Ontario